The 1966 NCAA Men's Soccer Tournament was the eighth organized men's college soccer tournament by the National Collegiate Athletic Association, to determine the top college soccer team in the United States. The San Francisco Dons won their first title, defeating the Long Island Blackbirds, 5–2, in the final on December 3, 1966. This tournament returned to a field of 16 teams. The tournament final was played in Berkeley, California. The most outstanding offensive player of the tournament was Sandor Hites of San Francisco.

Teams

Bracket 

Long Island defeated Michigan State per the rules, as at the time after 4 overtime periods the team with the most corner-kicks (CK) was declared the winner.

Final

See also
 1966 NAIA Soccer Championship

References 

1966 NCAA soccer season
NCAA Division I Men's Soccer Tournament seasons
NCAA
NCAA Soccer Tournament
NCAA Soccer Tournament